Arthur Brend Winterbotham (19 April 1838 – 8 September 1892) was an English cloth manufacturer and Liberal Party politician.

Winterbotham was the son of Lindsey Winterbotham and Sarah Ann Page. His father was a banker of Stroud, Gloucestershire. He was educated at Amersham School.  After joining Thomas Hunt as partner in Cam Mill (previously known as Corrietts Mill) he moved to Cam, Gloucestershire, where he was a cloth manufacturer. He built a house at Norman Hill, Dursley, Gloucestershire.

In 1885 Winterbotham was elected Member of Parliament (MP) for Cirencester. He held the seat until his death in 1892 aged 54.

Winterbotham married Elizabeth Strachan in 1863 and had two sons Arthur and Herbert. His brother Henry Selfe Page Winterbotham was also a Member of Parliament.

References

External links

1838 births
1892 deaths
Liberal Party (UK) MPs for English constituencies
UK MPs 1885–1886
UK MPs 1886–1892
UK MPs 1892–1895
British textile industry businesspeople
People from Stroud
Liberal Unionist Party MPs for English constituencies
Members of the Parliament of the United Kingdom for Cirencester